The Klyntar (colloquial: symbiotes) are a fictional species of extraterrestrial symbiotes appearing in American comic books published by Marvel Comics, most commonly in association with Spider-Man. The symbiotes form a symbiotic bond with their hosts, through which a single entity is created. They are able to alter their hosts' personalities and/or memories by influencing their darkest desires, along with amplifying their physical and emotional traits and personality and thereby granting them super-human abilities. There are more than 40 known symbiotes in the Marvel Universe.

The first and most well-known symbiote is Venom, who originally attached itself to Spider-Man during the 1985 Secret Wars miniseries. After Spider-Man rejected it upon discovering its true evil nature, the symbiote bonded with his rival, Eddie Brock, with whom it first became Venom. The character has since endured as one of Spider-Man's archenemies, though he has also been occasionally depicted as an antihero. Other characters have later merged with the Venom symbiote, including the villain Mac Gargan, and Flash Thompson, who became the superhero Agent Venom. Other well-known symbiotes are Carnage, an offspring of Venom who, when merged with its most infamous host, Cletus Kasady, has served as an enemy of both Spider-Man and Venom; and Anti-Venom, which originated when the Venom symbiote re-merged with Brock after a long split, gaining a new white appearance and additional powers as a result of Martin Li using his powers on Brock to cure his cancer.

Since their conception, the symbiotes have appeared in various media adaptations, including films, television series, and video games. Venom has been the most featured one, appearing in the 2007 film Spider-Man 3, and as the titular protagonist of the 2018 film Venom. Carnage also made its cinematic debut in the film Venom: Let There Be Carnage (2021).

Publication history
The first appearance of a symbiote occurs in The Amazing Spider-Man #252, The Spectacular Spider-Man #90, and Marvel Team-Up #141 (released concurrently in May 1984), in which Spider-Man brings one home to Earth after the Secret Wars (Secret Wars #8, which was released months later, details his first encounter with it). The concept was created by a Marvel Comics reader; the publisher purchased the idea for $220. The original design was then modified by Mike Zeck, at which point it became the Venom symbiote. The concept would be explored and used throughout multiple storylines, spin-off comics, and derivative projects.

Depictional

Fictional history

Symbiotes were originally created by an ancient malevolent primordial deity named Knull. When the Celestials began their vast plan to evolve the universe, Knull, seeing that his "Kingdom" was being touched, retaliated by constructing All-Black, the first symbiote, and subsequently cut off a Celestial's head. The other Celestials then banished Knull, along with the severed Celestial head, deeper into space. After that, he started using the head's cosmic energies as a forge for the symbiotes, which is how they developed the weaknesses to sound and fire. The head would later become interdimensional crossroads and laboratory Knowhere. Knull then embarked on a campaign of genocide against the other gods. During a battling with the gods, he crashed on a desolate planet where All-Black left him and went to Gorr, drawn to his murderous hate, who tried to kill Knull. Knull later reawakened  and created an army of symbiotes, which he used to conquer planets and destroy entire civilizations, establishing the Symbiote Imperium in the process.   However, when a dragon-like creature journeyed to the medieval Earth, Thor defeated it and destroyed the connection between Knull and the symbiotes. Subsequently, the symbiote hive-mind began to explore notions of honor and nobility as they bonded to benevolent hosts. The symbiotes subsequently rebelled against their god, imprisoning him at the heart of an artificial planet in the Andromeda Galaxy they called Klyntar, from which derived the name of their species. Ashamed of their dark past, the symbiotes desired to spread and maintain peace throughout the Cosmos by seeking out worthy hosts from various species to create an organization of noble warriors. However, these altruistic goals were imperfect, as the Klyntar symbiotes could be corrupted by hosts with harmful chemical imbalances or problematic personality traits, turning them into destructive parasites that would spread lies and disinformation about their own kind to make other peoples fear and hate the Klyntar species as a whole.

The corrupted Klyntar became more widespread than their benevolent counterparts, establishing a spacefaring culture dedicated to infecting and overtaking whole planets and reestablishing the Imperium. These symbiotes forced their hosts to perform death-defying feats to feed off of the resulting surges of hormones, like adrenaline and phenethylamine. These hosts would die quickly, either because of the wear from constant stress and exertion or as a result of the inherent danger of the stunts performed.

At some point it was believed that a symbiote-run planet was devoured by Galactus. Due to their hive-mind's memory, all symbiotes now loathe both Galactus and his former herald, the Silver Surfer, but it was later revealed that their hatred for the Silver Surfer was because he had time traveled to a time where the Klyntar were rebelling against Knull and the Silver Surfer had made the God of the symbiotes bleed. ZZZXX, a symbiote with a predilection for eating brains, was also captured by the Shi'ar, and imprisoned and studied for years until it was released and employed as a Praetorian Guard by Gabriel Summers. The corrupted symbiotes had invaded the Microverse and tried to absorb the Enigma Force, but they were defeated by the avatar of the force, after they had caused destructive effects on this world and its people. The symbiote would arrive on the Savage Land, where it remained trapped for years to the point of madness and bonded to Conan during a confrontation between the Savage Avengers and Kulan Gath.

During the Kree-Skrull War, the Kree wanted to replicate the Skrull's shapeshifting abilities; they acquired a newborn symbiote which had been outcast from its species on the planet where Knull had created them. They recruited Tel-Kar to be bonded to the young symbiote, and modified both Tel-Kar and the symbiote so that he could have full control over it. He infiltrated the Skrulls using the symbiote's shapeshifting ability, but was discovered. He deleted the symbiote's memories and separated himself from it. The symbiote then reunited with the parasitic symbiotes, retaining little memory of its first host. When the corrupted symbiotes found out that this symbiote wanted to commit to its host rather than exploit it as they tended to do, they decided that it was insane and trapped it in a canister to be condemned to die on a planet that would later become part of Beyonder's Battleworld. There, it would be encountered by Spider-Man in the 1984 miniseries Secret Wars. In that story, which saw the heroes of Earth transported to this planet to battle their archenemies, Spider-Man sought to repair or replace his tattered costume, which had been damaged in battle, and was directed by Thor and Hulk to a device inside the alien compound that they had come to use as headquarters. Mistaking the device in which the symbiote was imprisoned for the device Thor and Hulk mentioned, Spider-Man activated it, freeing the symbiote, which appeared before him as a black sphere that enveloped his body and took on the form of a black version of his costume that could respond to his mental commands. Spider-Man assumed that the device produced clothing designed to do this. He did not know that Deadpool had already briefly bonded with the symbiote and had corrupted it with his unstable personality. Spider-Man returned to Earth with the symbiote, where, after discovering that it was an alien lifeform that wanted to bond with him, he managed to separate himself from it by using sound waves to hurt the creature, which took refuge in a church's bell tower. It later bonded with Eddie Brock, who went to the church, despondent and vengeful after his journalism career was destroyed because he incorrectly identified the serial killer known as Sin-Eater as a man who later turned out to be a compulsive confessor; he blamed this turn of events on Spider-Man. Having bonded with the symbiote, the two became the being known as Venom. During this time, it spawned seven offspring and a clone; its first child later had three of its own, producing the symbiotes known as Carnage, Scream, Lasher, Phage, Agony, and Riot.

The Venom symbiote eventually becomes too much for Eddie to handle, and he separates himself from it. This separation causes a telepathic scream that is heard by the other corrupted symbiotes, who then invade Earth. Eddie, Spider-Man and Scarlet Spider team up against the invasion. The battle comes to an end when Eddie rebinds with Venom, causing another scream which results in the symbiotes committing suicide.

While bonded to Flash Thompson as part of Project Rebirth, who originally struggled to control it, the symbiote developed a slight affection for him. It is later established that the host's mental state affects the symbiote just as much as the other way around: Venom's first child, the Carnage symbiote, is as psychotic as its host, Cletus Kasady, and the Venom suit's explosiveness worsened after bonding with Angelo Fortunato and Mac Gargan, both of whom are career criminals. Likewise, the various symbiotes bonded to heroes are not shown to be as twisted, though they do occasionally struggle with aggression.

A swarm of Brood that had been overtaken by symbiotes later invade the S.W.O.R.D. satellite and possess all of its inhabitants, including Deathbird and her unborn child, to expand the symbiote Imperium. However, Spider-Man, bonded to a second symbiote, defeats the symbiotes with help from his class at Jean Grey's School.

The Klyntar were later raided by the Poisons with help from Haze Mancer, a symbiote poacher, resulting in the apparent death of the Agents of the Cosmos and the abduction of all the symbiotes. The abducted symbiotes were later modified by the Poisons so they could be used on the superheroes on Earth, in order for the Poisons to consume. After the defeat of the Poisons, the surviving symbiotes were returned to Klyntar.

When the body of Grendel, the dragon-like composite symbiote defeated by Thor, is discovered on Earth, this reawakens Knull enough to allow him to control the creature. It is subsequently stopped by the combined efforts of Venom and Miles Morales, and is later incinerated by Eddie, denying Knull the chance to escape Klyntar.

After some months, a cult had gotten hold of Cletus's damaged body inside a chamber and had planned to revive him by using the Grendel's remnants, which they stole from Maker. This cult, who worships Knull and Carnage as Knull's prophet, was led by Scorn. They implanted the remnants inside Cletus, reviving him, and at first he resembled Ancient Venom (Venom possessed by Knull), until the Carnage pieces were absorbed by the ancient symbiote and acquired Scorn's remnants by killing her. When Cletus came in contact with Knull, he got a new purpose: to free Knull. The only way left to do this was to acquire every single Codex – the symbiote remnants containing the genetic information of the host – left inside the bodies of every single host, dead or alive, who came into physical contact with the symbiotes on Earth, to overload the symbiote hive mind and scatter the Klyntar.

Knull slowly began reawakening as a result of Carnage's efforts on Earth and the symbiotes of Klyntar began succumbing to his control once more. When Sleeper was drawn to Klyntar, the symbiotes attacked and tried to assimilate it into the hive-mind. After escaping, Sleeper realized that Eddie was in danger and returned to Earth as quickly as it could. When Knull fully awakened, he destroyed Klyntar and seized control of its constituent symbiotes, coalescing them into a horde of symbiote-dragons.

Culture
The symbiotes, when they were originally created, were used as tools by Knull to conquer the universe. At the time, they had a symbiote dialect. When they were freed from Knull's control and began learning about compassion, they established the lie about their nature to redeem themselves. They formed the Agents of Cosmos, symbiotes bonded to benevolent hosts, forming noble warriors who try to maintain peace across the universe. However, some symbiotes were corrupted by malevolent hosts, turning them back into monsters and reestablishing the symbiote Imperium first formed by Knull; these symbiotes were cut from the Klyntar hive mind. The symbiote Imperium would conquer planets and infect their inhabitants to drain and consume them.

The symbiotes in general don't have an actual culture. As seen with Venom and Carnage, the symbiote's personality and psychology depends largely on the host's nature, as the link between the host and the symbiote is what gives the symbiote a purpose and meaning to their life.

As for the Nameless, a group of Kree explorers infected by the Exolon parasites, after being infected by the parasites which consumed their souls, they lost all sense of time and sentience and started engaging in gruesome self-inflicted pain rituals to remember their past lives.

Biology

The symbiotes are an alien species of inorganic, amorphous and multicellular symbiotic parasites formed from Knull's "Living Abyss". The symbiotes function as living extradimensional tesseracts, requiring living hosts to anchor them to the fabric of space and time. They record the genetic material of each of their hosts in a genetic codex. They also empower a host's natural abilities to the point that they far exceed that of normal members of the host's species. These abilities include the following:

 superhuman strength (strong enough to lift 50 tons or more), speed, endurance, agility, healing powers, and intelligence

 genetic memory, allowing them to recall information from previous hosts. They also leave traces of themselves, called codex, attached to the host's DNA, to send information to the hive mind
 the ability to negate damage caused by terminal illnesses and permanent injuries. While symbiotes can somewhat heal their hosts, they generally seek to force their hosts to depend on them in order ensure their own survival. For example, Eddie Brock was able to survive indefinitely with terminal cancer, and Scott Washington was able to walk despite being paraplegic. Similarly, Flash Thompson and Cletus Kasady had received "legs" when bonded with the Venom symbiote and Carnage symbiote even though they had lost their legs. Wraith was able to use his Exolon powers to cure the Kree who were infected by the Phalanx.
 they can reproduce asexually with a limited number of seeds inside their mass. For example, Venom gave birth to seven "children", and its first child Carnage had three.
 senses that extend over its entire surface, enabling hosts to "see" what is behind them or otherwise not in their line of sight (like a Spider-Sense).
 the ability to change shape and size at will. This ability functions regardless of the host's actual stature and bodily dimensions, as the symbiotes are living tesseracts. This includes expanding to any size as long as they have something to grow on, such as a host or an object.  Symbiotes can form multi-layered shields against powerful attacks and fit inside of small areas, such as electric wires and the insides of cars, to completely disable them. This shapeshifting allows the symbiote to change its color and texture, which allows it to blend into the environment as a form of camouflage, or to change the host's outward appearance (including mimicking the appearances of other beings).
 the ability to sense the thoughts and will of the host. When Spider-Man was originally selected, he had been thinking about Spider-Woman's costume in the Secret Wars. The symbiote acted on this and formed a similar costume to hers and Knull's emblem, which is the one seen on Spider-Man and Venom. 
 the ability to excrete matter that enters in its body, like bullets, turning them into the green saliva
 immortality, as evidenced by Venom 2099, which was still alive in the year 2099, and All-Black, which was created in the beginning of the Universe and was still alive in King Thor's timeline.
 the ability to merge with other symbiotes or otherwise absorb one another. This is similar to how Hybrid was formed, or when Carnage absorbed another symbiote from the Negative Zone, regenerating itself. The symbiote can also absorb the codices of other symbiotes, obtaining their genetic memory - for example, when Spider-Man bonded to two other symbiotes, they absorbed the Venom's codex, allowing then to appear exactly like Venom.
 the ability to force their hosts into a comatose state, as shown with Zak-Del and Eddie Brock
 the ability to prolong their host's life by replacing their failing organs with simulacrums manifested from their living abyss - however, they cannot do this indefinitely

Because they record the genetic material of each of its hosts, there are also additional powers that have been demonstrated, but are not necessarily universal to all symbiotes:
 the ability to block parts of the host's mind - Venom and all its descendants possess the ability to bypass Spider-Man's Spider-Sense; because the original symbiote was attached to Peter Parker (Spider-Man) first, it took his genetic information and spider-powers by using its Parasitic Inheritance. This means that battles between Peter and Venom or any of its descendants would essentially be a fight between Peter and his black-suited self, which wouldn't set off his Spider-Sense (during the Clone Saga, this became complicated, as Venom did set off Ben Reilly's Spider-Sense; however, this has been attributed to Ben being cloned from Peter prior to his first encounter with the Venom symbiote).
 the ability to form fangs or simple bladed weapons out of their limbs. The first appearance of this was the Carnage symbiote.
 the ability to form tendrils and tentacles of various lengths from their body
 the ability to form wings, as shown when Venom came into contact with Knull and grew a pair of web-like wings; in some cases the symbiote has also been shown to form gliding wings (see Venom-Punisher and Hybrid) 
 in the case of the purified Klyntar, Cosmic Awareness, which allows the Agents of Cosmos to sense people in need
 the ability to project the surface of the symbiote to attack at a distance
 the ability to sustain its humanoid body even without a host, but only for a certain period of time
 the ability to stick to walls (adapted from Spider-Man)
 the ability to produce acid, toxins, and venoms, like the venomous bite Venom delivered to Sandman (see Venom, Agony, and Venom 2099)
 the ability to produce webbing from its own mass (adapted from Spider-Man)
 the ability to sense the presence of other beings within a certain distance
 the ability to protect hosts from Ghost Rider's Penance Stare and the Inheritors's Life Absorption Touch
 the ability to generate and manipulate an ice-like substance (adapted from Iceman), use telepathy and telekinesis (adapted from Marvel Girl), create powerful kinetic blasts (adapted from Cyclops), increase strength and intelligence (adapted from Beast) and grant the host with the ability to fly (adapted from Angel)
 the ability to create storage portals inside of themselves (this allowed Peter Parker to stow and access his camera)
 the ability to filter breathable air for its host, allowing them to breathe underwater (seen in Vengeance of Venom), inhale poisonous fumes, and even survive in the vacuum of space
 the ability to transfer symbiote traits to its host - for example, when Carnage ate Karl Malus and he became a symbiote-human hybrid
 in the case of the Venom symbiote, the possession of empathic abilities, and the ability to project desires and needs into the thoughts of its host or potential hosts; this ability can also aid Venom in detecting the truth from those he interrogates.
 in some realities, the symbiote feeds on the baser emotions of its host, creating an increasingly hostile personality. The longer the host is exposed to the symbiote, the more overpowering this state of mind becomes.
 each symbiote has its own unique abilities: Venom has a venomous bite; Toxin can change its shape and form into a Spider-Man-like build (slim, but strong) and Venom-like build (big and muscular) depending on its mood; Scream can use its web-like hair as a weapon; Agony can spit acid and manipulate matter; Phage can create bladed weapons; Lasher can create tendrils on its back; Riot can use bludgeoning weapons and agility; Payback can produce electricity; Scorn can fuse itself with technology; All-Black can grant its host immortality; and Sleeper possesses chemokinesis, the ability to manipulate chemicals, providing limited telepathy and excellent cloaking abilities through pheromones.
 some symbiotes are immune to sonic attacks and fire through modification, like Anti-Venom, Red Goblin, Mayhem, Payback and Grendel. 
 the ability to change the mood of its host by manipulating their brain chemicals
 the ability to replicate itself, as seen with Carnage and All-Black in the mainstream universe and Venom in Spider-Man Reign

However, the symbiotes also possess weaknesses that can be fatal. Some of these weaknesses include:
 a natural weakness to sonic attacks and heat-based attacks, which Knull unintentionally gave them while they were being forged. However, symbiotes have a growing resistance to sound and fire due to their evolution. Still, there has not been an invulnerable symbiote in mainstream continuity, because the newest breeds can be harmed by incredible amounts of sonic waves and heat. Symbiotes, like Krobaa, are also seemingly vulnerable to light. The symbiotes in Ultimate Marvel are only vulnerable to the heat produced by high voltage electricity.
 vulnerability to chemical and biological attacks - for example, Iron Man created a cure to a virus-like bio-weapon based on the Venom symbiote that was created by Doctor Doom. Venom and Carnage have shown susceptibility to chemical inhibitors. Whether a symbiote can mutate and reduce the effect of these weaknesses is unknown.
 potential hosts with advanced healing factors, such as Wolverine, have shown resistance to symbiosis.
 in some incarnations, the symbiote is depicted as requiring a certain chemical (most likely phenethylamine) to stay sane and healthy, which has been said to be found abundantly in two sources: chocolate and human brain tissue. Thus, the host is forced to either consume large amounts of chocolate or become a cannibal who devours the brains of those they kill. This peculiar trait has only been witnessed in the Venom symbiote. However, both Carnage and Toxin have threatened their enemies with aspirations to "eat their brains", as well as various other body parts. When Toxin teamed up with Spider-Man and Black Cat, he struggled to keep himself together, but told Spider-Man that he was only "joking" about eating the robbers' brains. Similarly, the Exolons feed on the immortal soul of the hosts, making the hosts immortal; however, this causes the host to descend into madness, as well making them forget all of their old memories unless they inflict pain to themselves in an attempt to keep their memories for longer (see Zak-Del and the Nameless)
 on at least one occasion, Spider-Man was able to exhaust the Venom symbiote by taking advantage of the fact that it made its webbing out of itself; after the symbiote had already used a great deal of webbing to bind him to a bell, Spider-Man forced Venom to use further webbing so that it would exhaust itself, like blood dripping from a wound (although the sheer amount of webbing that the symbiotes would need to use for this weakness to be exploited makes its use in a fight limited).
 inability to bond to more than one host, as shown when Venom tried to bond to both Eddie and Peter at the same time and again with Flash and Eddie (although the Carnage symbiote did not display this weakness when bonding itself to people in Doverton, Colorado)
 susceptibility to feelings - in the storyline Planet of the Symbiotes, Eddie Brock releases a cry of pain and agony so great that the entire symbiote race commits mass suicide, but how they kill themselves is not clear.
 the Xenophages, a race of extraterrestrial shapeshifters which prey on symbiotes, possess the ability to spew an unknown incendiary chemical that can paralyze symbiotes and enhance their taste.
 numerous occasions have shown that when a corrupted symbiote remains bonded to a host for too long, the symbiote will eventually consume the body of the host, leaving the host a dead husk (see the soldiers who were bonded to the Grendel symbiotes and with Peter Parker in two What If?!)
 when Eddie Brock was diagnosed with cancer, Martin Li used his Lightforce healing ability to cure him, accidentally producing white blood cells in Eddie's blood which combatted the Venom's symbiote remnants; this created a new, non-sentient symbiote called Anti-Venom. This symbiote had the ability to cure every sickness (including Spider-Man's powers) and it was also corrosive to the symbiotes, as shown when Eddie and Flash nearly killed Venom, Mania, the Poisons and Red Goblin. There have been no symbiotes shown to be immune to Anti-Venom.
 vulnerability to the abilities of telepaths
 a new and still mysteriously extraterrestrial race known as Poisons, apparently nature's answer to the symbiotes, prey on them through direct contact infection, which forms an unstoppable one-sided union that the symbiote wants no part of.

List of symbiotes

Major symbiote characters
The following symbiotes have appeared throughout several years of Spider-Man's history, appeared in multiple media such as film and video games, and were main characters/villains in story arcs.

Other symbiote characters
The following symbiotes have made only a few other appearances in comic books and are usually excluded from adaptations in other media.

Other versions

Ultimate Marvel
In the Ultimate Marvel universe, the Venom suit is a man-made creation born of an experiment by Richard Parker and Edward Brock Sr., who were hoping to develop a protoplasmic cure for severe illnesses. Bolivar Trask, who was funding the research, intended to weaponize it. It used Richard's DNA as the starting base; thus, himself and Peter are "related" to it. When bonding to a host, the organic matter that comprises the suit envelops the host, regardless of resistance, and temporarily blinds it, before encasing itself in a hard casing, similar to a pupa. When the host emerges, the suit then shifts its appearance and function to assist its host, such as creating eyes for it to see through; if bonded with an incompatible host, it tries to take it over, inducing a homicidal rage in the suit's attempt to feed itself. When bonded with a host and forcibly removed, the suit leaves trace amounts of itself in their bloodstream, which attracts other samples of Venom and allows it to overload Peter's spider-sense. In the video game Ultimate Spider-Man, absorbing the trace amounts in Peter's blood allowed Eddie to take complete control of the suit, giving him a greater ability to talk and adorning him with a spider symbol on his chest.

Venom's only known weakness is electricity. Larger amounts of the suit will need more electricity to kill, as varying amounts of the suit will be stunned or vaporized by electric shocks. This was first seen in Ultimate Spider-Man #38, when an electric wire got tangled around Venom's foot. An electrocution from live power-lines vaporized the smaller amount on Peter, while a similar amount disabled Eddie. Note that in the video game Ultimate Spider-Man, when Electro electrocutes Venom during a cutscene, the suit is not affected by the shock like it was by the live power-line in the "Venom" arc. The suit can take the Shocker's vibro-shocks, and can protect its host from a bullet, which feels like nothing more than a relaxing vibration. When worn by a host other than Richard's son Peter, the host is compelled to take the life energy of other human beings or else have their own be consumed by the suit. The original Spider-Man (Peter Parker) was able to control the suit to a greater extent than anyone else because of his powers and because the suit was designed for his father.

The Carnage symbiote also appears in the Ultimate universe as a parasite genetically engineered by Curt Conners and Ben Reilly from Peter's DNA based on Richard's research. Traces of the Venom suit remaining in Peter's blood give Carnage similar properties to those of the Venom suit. It also devours people, but does not require a host. When first introduced, the organism was a blob of instinct, with no intelligence or self-awareness, its only aim to feed on the DNA of others, including that of Gwen Stacy, to stabilize itself. After feeding on multiple people, Carnage turns into a damaged form of Richard and Peter, with the memories of itself as Spider-Man. Carnage tries to absorb Peter so it can become whole, but Peter throws Carnage into a smokestack, burning the beast, although it is revealed that the organism had survived and turned into a replica of Gwen's form with Gwen's memories. During an encounter with Eddie Brock, the Venom suit absorbs the Carnage suit into itself, making itself complete and leaving Gwen a normal human being.

Spider-Gwen
In Spider-Gwen's universe, Dr. Elsa Brock creates a cure to Harry Osborn's Lizard DNA by using Spider-Gwen's radioactive isotopes, given to her by S.I.L.K. Leader Cindy Moon. When Gwen injects the isotopes into Harry, the Lizard serum combines with the Spider isotopes and transforms into Venom. Venom then bonds to Spider-Gwen, which gives her her powers back and she becomes Gwenom. This symbiote, in its natural form, is made up of some spiders working together and is weak to sonic attacks only when bonded to a host; without a host, it is not susceptible to this weakness.

Amalgam Comics
In the Amalgam Comics universe, the facility which created Spider-Boy started experimenting on a substance that they obtained from an alien spaceship. They inadvertently created a crystalline symbiote named Bizarnage (amalgamation of Carnage and Bizarro). It had the powers of Spider-Boy and started attacking everyone, until Spider-Boy defeated it.

MC2
In the alternate universe of the Marvel Comics 2, or MC2 imprint, Norman Osborn obtained Eddie's blood (he was still bonded to Venom at the time) and extracted the symbiote codex. Norman then combined the codices with May's DNA and created a symbiote/human hybrid clone of Mayday Parker. The clone stayed in stasis inside a chamber until Peter, with Norman's mind, became Goblin God and awoke the hybrid. When Peter returned to normal, the hybrid, under the alias Mayhem/Spider-Girl, went to live with the Parker family, naming herself April Parker.

In a later timeline, Mayhem accidentally killed the real Spider-Girl and became a murderous vigilante after killing American Dream. The government, in an attempt to stop her, used pieces of the dead Carnage symbiote (after it had been killed by Mayday) to create living weapons dubbed Bio-Predators. The Bio-preds ran wild, decimating the world and its defenders. Mayhem, seeing the error of her ways, went back in time and sacrificed herself to stop her past self from killing Spider-Girl, ensuring the events that led to the Biopreds' creation never occurred, even though she may have survived.

"Spider-Verse"
During the 2014 "Spider-Verse" storyline, in Spider-Punk's universe, V.E.N.O.M, also known as Variable Engagement Neuro-sensitive Organic Mesh, was created by Oscorp and was worn by the Thunderbolt Department, the police and fire department of President Osborn, so that he could have full control over the city. However, they are all subsequently defeated by Spider-Punk using his guitar.

"Spider-Geddon"
During the 2018 "Spider-Geddon" storyline, in the universe of Peni Parker, aka SP//dr, VEN#m is a giant mech-suit, powered by a Sym Engine and created to serve as back-up in case the SP//dr failed. It was piloted by Addy Brock until, in a battle against a technological monster named M.O.R.B.I.U.S., the suit gained a conscience and went rogue. Though SP//dr is able to defeat VEN#m, she is too late to stop it from consuming Addy, as well as her version of Aunt May, who flew in to fix the problem manually.

What If...

...Spider-Man had rejected the Spider?
"What if?: The Other", set during "The Other" storyline, features an alternative version of Peter who abandons the Spider when given the choice. Some time afterward, the Venom symbiote leaves its current host Mac Gargan and merges with Peter, who was inside a cocoon to become Poison. Poison, now calling himself "I", chooses Mary Jane to be his companion. He fails to gain her affection and digs up the grave of Gwen Stacy instead. The last images reveals Poison watching over a new cocoon like his own, as it bursts forth showing a hand similar to Carnage's, even though the normal symbiotes are unable to bond with dead hosts.

"Age of Apocalypse"
In a "What if?" "Age of Apocalypse" reality, in which both Charles Xavier and Eric Lensherr were killed, Apocalypse is served by clones of a symbiote Spider-Man, although the clones seem to be more symbiote than man.

Spider-Man: India
In Spider-Man: India, the symbiotes are parasitic demons with outward tusk-like fangs, who had ruled the world in the past but got trapped inside an amulet. The amulet was eventually found by Nalin Oberoi and transformed him into the Green Goblin. During a fight with Spider-Man, the Green Goblin releases a demon to possess Spider-Man, but is expelled. After the defeat of Green Goblin, the amulet is thrown into ocean, leaving Venom the only demon alive.

What The--?!
In the What The--?!, "The Bee-Yonder" gives Spider-Ham a version of the black uniform, but Spider-Ham likes his classic suit more, so he gets rid of it. In #20, Pork Grind, a pig version of Venom, is introduced as an enemy of Spider-Ham.

Contest of Champions
In the 2016 Contest of Champions series, where Maestro and Collector use the heroes of different worlds to battle with each other, when this version of Venom was killed by Punisher 2099, the remnants fused with the remains of the Void, creating the Symbioids.

Earth X
In the universe of Earth-9997, the symbiotes, like all sentient life, were created by the Celestials as "antibodies" to protect the embryos which resided in the core of the planets. Like the Asgardians and Mephisto, the symbiotes eventually reached the third stage of metamorphosis and apotheosized into metaphysical entities, given physical form by what others believed them to be and required of them. The Venom symbiote was given form by Spider-Man, who believed it to be a symbiotic living costume; after being bonded to Eddie Brock for years, it bonded to Peter's daughter May Parker, who managed to tame and rehabilitate it to start her career as the superhero Venom.

Spider-Man Unlimited
In the Spider-Man Unlimited series, a Synoptic is introduced. Synoptics are parasites that can control organic beings via touch. Venom and Carnage, who act as double agents to the High Evolutionary, are able to revive the Synoptic.

Spider-Man: Spider's Shadow
In the 2021 miniseries Spider's Shadow, the symbiote manages to form a stronger bond with Peter after the Hobgoblin kills May Parker, which leads to Peter succumbing to its influence and killing several of his familiar rogues before the FF are able to expel the symbiote from him. Unfortunately, the symbiote is able to escape captivity and bond with Reed Richards, allowing its subsequent spawn to be altered so that they are immune to most of its traditional weaknesses. Despite these symbiotes managing to bond with various Avengers, X-Factor, and the rest of the FF, Peter and Johnny Storm are able to trick the original symbiote into trying to re-bond with Peter, only to reveal that it was pursuing Johnny while he was using an image inducer. The death of the prime symbiote destroys all of its spawn (although it kills Reed before its defeat).

In other media

Television
 The Venom and Carnage symbiotes appear in Spider-Man: The Animated Series.
 The Venom and Carnage symbiotes appear in Spider-Man Unlimited (1999).
 The Venom symbiote appears in The Spectacular Spider-Man. Additionally, Carnage was also set to appear in the third season before the series was cancelled.
 The Venom, Carnage and Anti-Venom symbiotes appear in Ultimate Spider-Man.
 A gamma variant of the Venom symbiote appears in the Hulk and the Agents of S.M.A.S.H. episode "The Venom Within".
 The Klyntar, Venom and Carnage symbiotes, and the Exolons appear in Guardians of the Galaxy. This version of the Klyntar's homeworld was destroyed by Thanos, who took them to Planet X to weaponize them by altering their genealogy. Additionally, the Exolons are referenced as inhabiting Wraith's body and Carnage is stated to be a Klyntar instead of Venom's offspring.
 The Venom, Anti-Venom, Scream, Scorn, and Mania symbiotes, the Klyntar, and a variation of All-Black appear in Spider-Man (2017).
 An original symbiote named Syphon8r appears in the Moon Girl and Devil Dinosaur episode "The Borough Bully". Upon detecting a boy named Angelo's (voiced by Josh Keaton) jealousy towards Moon Girl and Devil Dinosaur, Syphon8r bonds with him, takes on the form of a four-armed troll with four tentacles for legs, and becomes an internet troll to feed off of his anger. While attempting to destroy the Washington Bridge to increase his popularity, Moon Girl depowers the symbiote before she and Devil defeat it, forcing it to retreat and abandon Angelo.

Film
 The Venom symbiote appears in Spider-Man 3.
 The Venom symbiote makes a cameo appearance in trailers for The Amazing Spider-Man 2, but was replaced with the Rhino's armor in the theatrical cut.
 The Venom and Riot symbiotes appear in the Sony's Spider-Man Universe (SSU) film Venom. Additionally, a blue symbiote designated SYM-A02 and a yellow symbiote designated SYM-A03 make minor appearances.
 The Venom and Carnage symbiotes appear in the SSU film Venom: Let There Be Carnage.

Marvel Cinematic Universe
Elements of symbiote-related characters serve as inspiration for media set in the Marvel Cinematic Universe (MCU).
 Exolon monks appear in the live-action film Guardians of the Galaxy as followers of Ronan the Accuser.
 A Necrosword inspired by All-Black appears in the live-action film Thor: Ragnarok as Hela's primary weapon.
 Two Necroswords appear in the Disney+ animated series What If...? episode "What If... T'Challa Became a Star-Lord?", wielded by an alternate reality version of the Collector.
 The SSU incarnation of the Venom symbiote makes an uncredited cameo appearance in the mid-credits scene of Spider-Man: No Way Home.
 A non-symbiote Necrosword appears in Thor: Love and Thunder, wielded by Gorr the God Butcher.

Video games
 An infinite number of symbiote clones created by Doctor Doom serve as the collective final boss of Spider-Man: The Video Game.
 The Venom, Carnage, Scream, Agony, Riot, Lasher, and Phage symbiotes appear in Venom/Spider-Man: Separation Anxiety.
 Clones of the Carnage symbiote created by Doctor Octopus, in addition to the original, appear in Spider-Man (2000).
 The Venom symbiote appears in the Spider-Man 3 film tie-in game. Additionally, an unidentified symbiote bonded to Shriek appears in the PS2, PSP, and Wii versions of the game.
 The Venom symbiote, Klyntar, Snatchers, Zombies, Berserkers, Grapplers, Slashers, Electrolings, Vulturelings, and Symbiote Pods appear in Spider-Man: Web of Shadows.
 The Ultimate Marvel incarnations of the Venom and Carnage symbiotes appear in Spider-Man: Shattered Dimensions.
 The Venom, Scream, Anti-Venom, and Hybrid symbiotes appear in Marvel: Avengers Alliance.
 The Venom symbiote appears in Lego Marvel Super Heroes.
 A nanite-based incarnation of the Venom symbiote appears in The Amazing Spider-Man 2 film tie-in game.
 Numerous symbiote-related characters appear in Spider-Man Unlimited (2014). Additionally, a "Symbiote Dimension" appears as a stage.
 Clones of the Venom symbiote created by the Green Goblin and Mysterio appear in Disney Infinity 2.0.
 The Venom, Carnage, and Anti-Venom symbiotes as well as symbiotes merged with Adaptoids called Symbioids appear in Marvel: Contest of Champions.
 The Venom and Carnage symbiotes as well as original symbiotes Carrier, Horror, Demolisher, and Mutation appear in Marvel Puzzle Quest.
 The Klyntar appear in Marvel Avengers Academy.
 The Venom symbiote, several unnamed symbiotes, and a giant, unnamed symbiote appear in Marvel vs. Capcom Infinite. Jedah Dohma uses the Soul Stone to steal a million souls from Earth and feed them to the giant symbiote in addition to giving pieces of it to A.I.M.brella, who bond them to virus-infected subjects to stabilize them. Spider-Man, Chris Redfield, Frank West, and Mike Haggar defeat Dohma, but he unleashes the creature on New Metro City. Nonetheless, the heroes gather three of the Infinity Stones and use them to destroy the giant symbiote.
 The Venom symbiote makes a cameo appearance in the ending of Marvel's Spider-Man (2018).
 The Venom symbiote makes a cameo appearance in the mid-credits scene of Spider-Man: Miles Morales.
 The Venom symbiote will appear in Marvel's Spider-Man 2.

Miscellaneous
 The Scream symbiote appears in The Amazing Adventures of Spider-Man.
 On October 10, 2022, Marvel Comics announced the Summer of Symbiotes upcoming event for New York Comic-Con in summer 2023.

References

External links
List of Venom Comics at TheVenomSite.com

symbiotes at Comic Vine
Marvel's most powerful symbiotes at IGN
16 symbiotes More Powerful Than Venom (And 9 Weaker) at Screenrant

Venom (character)
Fictional amorphous creatures
Fictional characters with healing abilities
Fictional parasites and parasitoids
Characters created by Roger Stern
Characters created by Tom DeFalco
Characters created by David Michelinie
Characters created by Mike Zeck
Marvel Comics alien species
Marvel Comics characters who are shapeshifters
Marvel Comics characters who can move at superhuman speeds
Marvel Comics characters with accelerated healing
Marvel Comics characters with superhuman strength
Hive minds in fiction
Fictional characters who can duplicate themselves
Fictional superorganisms